Shavon-e Sofla (also Romanized as Shāvon-e Soflá; also known as Shadoon Sofla, Shaun, Shāvon, and Shāvon-e Pā’īn) is a village in Ani Rural District, in the Central District of Germi County, Ardabil Province, Iran. At the 2006 census, its population was 23, in 5 families.

References 

Towns and villages in Germi County